Luftenberg an der Donau is a municipality and small market town in the district of Perg in the Austrian state of Upper Austria. As of 2015, the town had 3,979 inhabitants.

Population

History

References

Cities and towns in Perg District